This is a bibliography of published works on the history of Wales. It includes published books (by historians, antiquarians and translators), journals, and educational and academic history-related websites; it does not include self-published works, blogs or user-edited sites. Works may cover aspects of Welsh history inclusively or exclusively (see titles for guidance).

The list's primary purpose is to provide clearly-formatted sources for editors of articles on (or which contain elements of) Welsh history. Wikilinks to authors may provide further bibliographies. A Google Books link may be included, where search terms may yield individual page views or a free e-book.

Mediaeval writers
Anon: Chronicle of the Princes (Brut y Tywysogion) - see 1859
Anon: Annales Cambriae - see 1888
Bede - see online sources
Gerald of Wales - see 1806 and 1868
Gildas - see 1841

18th and 19th centuries
 - downloadable PDF

 - downloadable pdf
 - downloadable pdf

 - Translated from lost Latin text; in Welsh: Brut y Tywysogion

 

 - written from the perspective of Little England beyond Wales, i.e. Pembrokeshire and southwest Carmarthenshire, but includes wider areas

20th century

 - see also 2007 below

21st century

Online sources

National
Dictionary of Welsh Biography (National Library of Wales)
Oxford Dictionary of National Biography - subscription or sign in with library ID 
Welsh Journals online (National Library of Wales)
Welsh Newspapers online (National Library of Wales)
Royal Commission on the Ancient and Historical Monuments of Wales
Coflein RCAHMW online site: Roman remains in Wales
Cadw (Welsh Government Historic Environment Service)
Historic Wales (Welsh Government mapping site)
Ecclesiastical History of the English Nation (Bede) Book I, Fordham University
Ecclesiastical History of the English Nation (Bede) Book II, Fordham University
Ecclesiastical History of the English Nation (Bede) Book III, Fordham University
Ecclesiastical History of the English Nation (Bede) Book IV, Fordham University
Ecclesiastical History of the English Nation (Bede) Book V, Fordham University

Further sources on GENUKI
British History online (Wales)
Historical maps at the National Library of Scotland

Local
Clwyd-Powys Archaeological Trust
Dyfed Archaeological Trust
Glamorgan-Gwent Archaeological Trust 

Gwynedd Archaeological Trust

Wales
Wales
Wales-related lists
History of Wales